Senator Keenan may refer to:

Bob Keenan (born 1952), Montana State Senate
John F. Keenan (state senator) (born 1964), Massachusetts State Senate
Luke A. Keenan (1872–1924), New York State Senate
P. J. Keenan (1912–1979), Montana State Senate

See also
Senator Kenan (disambiguation)